Charkheh Bayan (also Romanized as Charkheh Bayān, Charkheh Beyān, Charkheh Biyān, and Charkheh-ye Bayān) is a village in Quri Chay Rural District, in the Central District of Dehgolan County, Kurdistan Province, Iran. At the 2006 census, its population was 137, in 36 families. The village is populated by Kurds.

References 

Towns and villages in Dehgolan County
Kurdish settlements in Kurdistan Province